Eugen Freiherr von Albori (or also known as Baron Eugen von Albori), (27 September 1838 – 4 September 1915) was an Austrian administrator. He served as the Austrian governor of Bosnia & Herzegovina between 1903 and 1907.

Notes 

1838 births
1915 deaths
Governors of Bosnia and Herzegovina
Barons of Austria